Prim, el asesinato de la calle del Turco is a Spanish television film directed by Miguel Bardem recreating the magnicide of Juan Prim in 1870. It originally aired on 15 December 2014 on La 1.

Premise 
Narrated by Benito Pérez Galdós, a young journalist at the time the events take place, the fiction accounts for the political intrigues and conspiracies in the last year of the life of General Prim, prime minister of Spain, who had to find a suitable candidate to the country's throne. It involves all the prime suspects behind Prim's murder, an unsolved case up to this date. Wounded in the assassination attempt, Prim would die two days later.

Cast 
 Francesc Orella as Juan Prim, Prime Minister of Spain also serving as Minister of War.
 Javier Godino as Benito Pérez Galdós, a young Canarian journalist.
 Pedro Casablanc as Felipe de Solís y Campuzano, Montpensier's confidant and personal secretary.
 Daniel Grao as José María Pastor, General Serrano's security chief.
 Javivi as Antonio de Orleans, Duke of Montpensier.
 Simón Andreu as Francisco Serrano y Domínguez, Regent of Spain.
 Manolo Solo as Juan José González Nandín, Prim's personal secretary.
 Yuriria del Valle as Francisca "Paca" Agüero, Prim's Mexican wife.
 Enrique Villén as Moya.
 Pepe Lorente as Bravo.
 Itsaso Arana as Josefa.
 Secun de la Rosa as Gaspar Ruiz.
 Luis Bermejo as Rojo Arias.
  as Montesinos.
 Carmen Segarra as Doña Encarna.
 Jesús Noguero as López.
  as Sostrada.
 David Pinilla as Topete.
 Francisco Olmo as Don Bernardo.

Production and release 
A Televisión Española co-production together with Shine Iberia, Televisió de Catalunya and Dream Team Concept, the TV movie was written by Nacho Faerna and Virginia Yagüe and directed by Miguel Bardem. It was created on occasion of the 200th anniversary of Joan Prim's birth.

The movie was pre-screened at the Festival Internacional de Cine de San Sebastián. Gregorio de la Fuente Monge and José Álvarez Junco collaborated as historical advisors. Aired in prime time on La 1 on 15 December 2014, the telefilm earned a 13.2% audience share and 2,491,000 viewers.

Awards and nominations 

|-
| align = "center"  rowspan = "2" | 2015 || Zapping Awards || Best Actor || Francesc Orella ||  || 
|-
| 3rd  || colspan = "2" | Best Miniseries or TV Movie ||  || 
|}

References 
References

Bibliography
 

Spanish television films
La 1 (Spanish TV channel) original programming
Spanish political thriller films
Films about conspiracy theories
Spanish-language television shows
Films about assassinations
2014 in Spanish television
Films set in 1870
Films set in Madrid
2014 television films
2010s political thriller films